Ramchandra Ghangare (born 16 June 1928, in Ghorad, Wardha) was a member of the 10th Lok Sabha of India. He represented the Wardha constituency of Maharashtra and is a member of the Communist Party of India political party. He was also member of legislative assembly from 1967 to 1972. In his political career he fought for upliftment of poor people. As an ardent communist  he sticks whole life to his principal. He contested many elections for Loksabha and vidhansabha with the popular support. He was motivational guru of famous social activist Sindhutai sapkal.

References

India MPs 1991–1996
1928 births
Living people
Marathi politicians
Communist Party of India politicians from Maharashtra
Lok Sabha members from Maharashtra
People from Wardha district
Members of the Maharashtra Legislative Assembly